Harry Evans Watkins (November 6, 1898 – June 6, 1963) was a United States district judge of the United States District Court for the Northern District of West Virginia and the United States District Court for the Southern District of West Virginia.

Education and career

Born in Watson, West Virginia, Watkins was a United States Army Private First Class in the Signal Corps from 1918 to 1919. He received a Bachelor of Laws from West Virginia University College of Law in 1923. He was in private practice in Fairmont, West Virginia from 1923 to 1937.

Federal judicial service

Watkins was nominated by President Franklin D. Roosevelt on February 17, 1937, to the United States District Court for the Northern District of West Virginia and the United States District Court for the Southern District of West Virginia, to a new joint seat created by 49 Stat. 1805. He was confirmed by the United States Senate on March 2, 1937, and received his commission on March 3, 1937. He served as Chief Judge of the Northern District from 1954 to 1963. Watkins served in that capacity until his death on June 6, 1963.

References

Sources
 

1898 births
1963 deaths
Judges of the United States District Court for the Southern District of West Virginia
Judges of the United States District Court for the Northern District of West Virginia
United States district court judges appointed by Franklin D. Roosevelt
20th-century American judges
Lawyers from Fairmont, West Virginia
West Virginia lawyers
West Virginia University alumni
United States Army soldiers